Ophthalmosaurinae is an extinct subfamily of ophthalmosaurid thunnosaur ichthyosaurs from the Middle Jurassic to the late Early Cretaceous (Bajocian - Albian) of Europe, North America and South America. Currently, the oldest and the basalmost known ophthalmosaurine is Mollesaurus from the early Bajocian of Argentina. Ophthalmosaurines were characterized by a large extracondylar area of the basioccipital in the form of a thick and concave peripheral band, posterodistally deflected ulnar facet of the humerus, large ulna with concave and edgy posterior surface and ischiopubis with obturator foramen.

Phylogeny 

Ophthalmosaurinae was named in 1887 by George H. Baur. It is a stem-based taxon defined phylogenetically for the first time by Fischer et al. (2012) as "all taxa closer to Ophthalmosaurus icenicus than to Platypterygius hercynicus". The cladogram below follows Fischer et al. 2012.

The following cladogram shows Ophthalmosaurinae according to the analysis performed by Jacobs and Martill (2020).

References

 
Middle Jurassic ichthyosaurs
Late Jurassic ichthyosaurs
Early Cretaceous ichthyosaurs
Aalenian first appearances
Early Cretaceous extinctions